L'Auberge Espagnole (literally: "the Spanish inn"), also known as Pot Luck (UK) and The Spanish Apartment (Australia), is a 2002 French-Spanish film directed and written by Cédric Klapisch. It is a co-production of Mate Production, Via Digital, BAC Films, Ce qui me meut, France 2 Cinéma and Studio Canal).

An economics graduate student from France, Xavier, spends a year in Barcelona to study. His fellow Erasmus students are from all over Western Europe and have a flatshare. They each speak different languages and have different cultural standards.

The film is told in the first person by Xavier. The dialogue is mostly in French, with some English and much Spanish, a little Catalan, Danish, German and Italian.

It is the first part of the Spanish Apartment trilogy, which continues in the sequels Russian Dolls (2005) and Chinese Puzzle (2013).

Plot
Xavier (Romain Duris), a 24-year-old student from France, attends the Erasmus programme in Barcelona to further his career, against the wishes of his girlfriend Martine (Audrey Tautou). On the flight, Xavier meets a married couple from France, a doctor and his wife. They invite him to stay in their home while he looks for somewhere to live. Xavier finds a flatshare with students from England, Belgium, Spain, Italy, Germany, and Denmark. The roommates develop a companionship as they struggle with their different languages and cultures.

Martine visits Xavier and returns disappointed when she realizes things are not the same. Xavier begins an affair with the French doctor's wife, using seduction tips learned from Isabelle (Cécile de France), his lesbian roommate from Belgium. William arrives from England to visit his sister Wendy and creates tension with his abrasive manner and culturally insensitive comments.

Xavier gets depressed and hallucinates after Martine breaks up with him. He seeks the doctor's advice, but the doctor tells Xavier that his wife has confessed everything, and tells him to stop seeing her.

Discord divides the roommates, but they come together to aid Wendy, who was nearly caught by her boyfriend in a romantic encounter with an American.

After saying goodbye to his new close friends, Xavier returns to Paris and gets his desired job at the ministry, but realizes that his experiences in Spain have changed him. He subsequently runs away on his first day on the job and pursues his dream to become a writer, recounting the story of his experiences in the Auberge Espagnole. Towards the end Xavier can be seen getting together with his now ex-girlfriend Martine as well.

Cast

 Romain Duris as Xavier
 Barnaby Metschurat as Tobias
 Judith Godrèche as Anne-Sophie
 Cécile de France as Isabelle
 Kelly Reilly as Wendy
 Audrey Tautou as Martine
 Cristina Brondo as Soledad
 Kevin Bishop as William
 Wladimir Yordanoff as Jean-Michel Perrin
 Federico D'Anna as Alessandro
 Christian Pagh as Lars
 Zinedine Soualem as The barman
 Lise Lamétrie as The woman in the ministry
 Martine Demaret as Xavier's mother
 Jacno as Xavier's father
 Olivier Raynal as Bruce
 Iddo Goldberg as Alistair
 Irene Montalà as Neus

Title
The phrase auberge espagnole is a French idiom, literally translated as "Spanish inn" or "Spanish hotel". It describes a place where customers can eat what they bring – by extension, that one must be independent.

Another French interpretation is what in English is known as "Going Dutch" or "potluck", hence its English title.

A third meaning of auberge espagnole is a common resting area for travellers from a variety of different cultures and regions.

Soundtrack
 Radiohead – "No Surprises"
 Daft Punk – "Aerodynamic"
 Sonia & Selena – "Que Viva La Noche"
 Marc-Antoine Charpentier – "Te Deum"
 Ali Farka Touré – "Ai Du"
 Frédéric Chopin – "Opus 64 No 2 Waltz in C sharp minor"
 Africando All Stars – "Betece"
 Mala Rodriguez – "La Cocinera"

Critical response
On Rotten Tomatoes, the film has an approval rating of 76%, based on 92 reviews, with an average rating of 6.53/10. The site's critical consensus reads: "This multicultural comedy captures the chaos and excitement of being young". On Metacritic, the film has a weighted average score of 65 out of 100, based on 31 critics, indicating "generally favorable reviews".

Awards

References

External links
 
 
 
 

2002 films
2002 romantic comedy films
Catalan-language films
2000s Danish-language films
2000s English-language films
English-language French films
English-language Spanish films
Films directed by Cédric Klapisch
Films set in Barcelona
Films shot in Paris
Films shot in Barcelona
2000s French-language films
2000s German-language films
2000s Italian-language films
2000s Spanish-language films
French LGBT-related films
Lesbian-related films
Spanish LGBT-related films
2002 LGBT-related films
Filmax films
France 2 Cinéma films
StudioCanal films
Castelao Producciones films
2002 multilingual films
French multilingual films
Spanish multilingual films
Spanish-language French films
2000s French films
2000s Spanish films